Mahendratanaya River is a medium-sized river in  India.

Mahendratanaya River is a major tributary river of Vamsadhara River which originates from Mahendragiri Hills.

This river merges in to Bay of Bengal near Baruva.

References

External links
 "Orissa plans to build a dam on the Mahendratanaya river" OutlookIndia.,com 26 March 2008. Retrieved 12 July 2019.

Rivers of Andhra Pradesh
Eastern Ghats
Rivers of India